Raffaele Franceschi (born 18 May 1960) is an Italian swimmer who won a bronze medal in the 4 × 200 m freestyle relay at the 1983 European Aquatics Championships. He also competed at the 1980 and 1984 Summer Olympics and finished fifth in the 100 m and 4 × 200 m freestyle events in 1980.

His brother, Giovanni Franceschi, is also a retired Olympic swimmer. In the 2000s, Raffaele was competing in the masters category.

References

1960 births
Living people
Italian male swimmers
Swimmers at the 1980 Summer Olympics
Swimmers at the 1984 Summer Olympics
Italian male freestyle swimmers
European Aquatics Championships medalists in swimming
Olympic swimmers of Italy
20th-century Italian people